Sir Thomas Bromley (1530–1587) was Lord Chancellor of England.

Thomas Bromley may also refer to:
Thomas Bromley (chief justice) (died 1555), English judge, chief justice of the King's Bench
Thomas Bromley (died 1641) (1585–1641), English landowner and politician
Thomas Bromley, 2nd Baron Montfort (1733–1799), British politician, MP for Cambridge
H. Thomas Bromley (1853–1924), English artist
Thomas Eardley Bromley (1911–1987), British ambassador

See also
Bromley (disambiguation)